Specavia (or Volgograd-Spetsavia, Russian Волгоград-СпецАвиа)) was a cargo airline based in Volgogrod, Russia. It was established in 1997 and ceased operations due to bankruptcy in 2006. Bankruptcy was blamed on a 50% drop in demand which led to a 20% fall in income in 2005. The airline ceased operations with debts of over 10 million roubles. Before operations ceased, Specavia specialised in crop-spraying but also carried out passenger and cargo charters as well as medical flights and search-and-rescue missions.

Fleet

References

Defunct airlines of Russia
Companies based in Volgograd Oblast
Russian companies established in 1997
Airlines established in 1997
Airlines disestablished in 2006